This is a list of the tallest buildings in Arlington, Virginia, ranked by height. Due to the height restrictions imposed in Washington D.C., many of the tallest buildings in the D.C metropolitan area are constructed in Arlington, right across the Potomac River from Washington.

Tallest under construction, approved, and proposed

Under construction

This lists buildings that are approved for construction in Arlington and are planned to rise at least .

See also
 List of tallest buildings in Virginia

References

Buildings and structures in Arlington County, Virginia
Tallest in Arlington
Arlington#